Mark Anthony Blake (born 16 December 1970) is an English former professional footballer who played in midfielder.

He notably played in the Premier League for both Aston Villa and Leicester City, as well as in the Football League for Wolverhampton Wanderers, Portsmouth, Walsall, Mansfield Town and Kidderminster Harriers.

Career
Blake started out as a trainee at Aston Villa, where he played a total of 31 games, scoring two goals. He had a brief loan spell at Wolverhampton Wanderers during early 1991, before leaving Villa for Portsmouth in August 1993 for £400,000.

He played just 15 games for Portsmouth before he returned to the Midlands less than eight months later when Leicester City paid £360,000 for him in March 1994 on transfer deadline day, two months before they won promotion to the Premier League.

He made 47 appearances for Leicester in two years before he dropped through the leagues to join Walsall. He spent two seasons at Walsall before his contract expired and he signed for Mansfield Town in August 1999. After two seasons and 83 league games he made his final move to Kidderminster Harriers.

References

External links

1970 births
Living people
Footballers from Nottingham
English footballers
England under-21 international footballers
Aston Villa F.C. players
Wolverhampton Wanderers F.C. players
Portsmouth F.C. players
Leicester City F.C. players
Walsall F.C. players
Mansfield Town F.C. players
Kidderminster Harriers F.C. players
Premier League players
English Football League players
Association football midfielders